Jordan L. Brailford (born October 9, 1995) is an American football outside linebacker for the New Orleans Breakers of the United States Football League (USFL). He played college football at Oklahoma State and was drafted by the Washington Redskins in the seventh round of the 2019 NFL Draft.

Professional career

Washington Redskins / Football Team
Brailford was selected by the Washington Redskins in the seventh round (253rd overall) of the 2019 NFL Draft. He signed his rookie contract with the team on May 2, 2019. He was placed on injured reserve on September 1, 2019. On September 5, 2020, Brailford was waived by Washington and signed to the practice squad the next day.

Minnesota Vikings
On October 13, 2020, Brailford was signed by the Minnesota Vikings off Washington's practice squad.
In Week 13 against the Jacksonville Jaguars, Brailford forced and recovered a fumble on Mike Glennon. He was waived on August 15, 2021.

Atlanta Falcons
On December 29, 2021, Brailford was signed to the Atlanta Falcons practice squad. He signed a reserve/future contract following the season's end. He was waived on August 30 and re-signed to the practice squad. On October 24, 2022, he was released from the practice squad.

New Orleans Breakers
On January 28, 2023, Brailford signed with the New Orleans Breakers of the United States Football League (USFL).

References

External links

Oklahoma State Cowboys bio

1995 births
Living people
Sportspeople from Tulsa, Oklahoma
Players of American football from Oklahoma
American football defensive ends
American football outside linebackers
Oklahoma State Cowboys football players
Washington Redskins players
Washington Football Team players
Minnesota Vikings players
Atlanta Falcons players
New Orleans Breakers (2022) players